Oslo Stock Exchange (OSE: OSLO) is a stock exchange within the Nordic countries and offers Norway’s only regulated markets for securities trading today. The stock exchange offers a full product range including equities, derivatives and fixed income instruments.

The Euronext consortium of European stock exchanges controls Oslo Stock Exchange as of June 2019.

History
Oslo Børs was established by a law of September 18, 1818. Trading on Oslo Børs commenced on April 15, 1819.

In 1881, Oslo Børs became a stock exchange, which means securities were listed. The first listing of securities contained 16 bond series and 23 stocks, including the Norwegian central bank (Norges Bank).

Oslo Børs cooperates with London Stock Exchange on trading systems. The exchange has also a partnership with the stock exchanges in Singapore and Toronto (Canada) for a secondary listing of companies.

The stock exchange was privatized in 2001, and is, after the merger in 2007, 100% owned by Oslo Børs VPS Holding ASA.

Oslo Børs Holding ASA was the holding company that owned Oslo Stock Exchange of Norway from 2001 to 2008. The company was created in 2001 when the Oslo Stock Exchange was converted from a self-owning institution to a public limited company. The ownership of Oslo Børs Holding was spread out between a large number of owners, the largest being DnB NOR (18%). The Nordic stock exchange group OMX held a 10% stake as well. The company was not publicly listed. In 2008 it merged with Verdipapirsentralen ASA (VPS) to create the new holding company Oslo Børs VPS Holding ASA.

Oslo Børs Holding had two subsidiaries, Oslo Børs ASA that operates the stock exchange and Oslo Børs Informasjon AS that manages the information systems of the exchange.

Market
Oslo Børs is today an online market place where all trading is done through computer networks. Trading starts at 09:00am and ends at 04:30pm local time (CET) on all days of the week except weekends and holidays declared by Oslo Børs in advance.

There are three markets for listing and trading on the stock exchange: 
Oslo Børs is the largest market place for listing and trading in equities, equity certificates, ETPs (exchange traded funds and notes), derivatives and fixed income products. Established in 1819, first as a commodity exchange. Equities and bonds listed and traded from 1881.

Oslo Axess was established in May 2007 as an alternative to Oslo Børs for listing and trading in shares.

Nordic ABM was established in June 2005 as an alternative bond market.

Merkur Market is a multilateral trading facility and was established in January 2016. The market place is not subject to the Stock Exchange Act or the Stock Exchange Regulations. Merkur Market is best suited for smaller and medium-sized companies or large companies that do not satisfy the admission requirements or do not wish to be fully listed on a regulated market.

Oslo Access

Oslo Axess is a regulated and licensed market under the auspices of the Oslo Stock Exchange.  The purpose is to promote growth among smaller companies, and give them the benefits achieved by having shares traded on a regulated market.

General
Oslo Axess is intended for companies seeking listing on a regulated market, but that does not meet the requirements for listing on the Oslo Stock Exchange.  Investors get protection and a seal of approval by the Oslo Axess, but this will however not be as comprehensive as for companies on the stock exchange.  The main target group are small and medium-sized companies, including pre-commercial companies.  Oslo Axess provides, like the regular stock exchange, access to capital, awareness, growth and liquidity for all listed companies.   It will serve as a springboard for companies with ambitions to be listed on the stock exchange in the future.  Oslo Axess operates with the same prices for trade as the Oslo Stock Exchange.

Licensing
Oslo Axess has a license from the Ministry of Finance to act as a regulated marketplace for trading in Norway .  Basically, the same laws as the Oslo Stock Exchange.  The first working day of the Oslo Axess was 2 May 2007.

Shares
Norwegian public limited companies and equivalent foreign companies can apply for their shares to be listed on Oslo Børs or Oslo Axess. It is up to the company itself to apply to be admitted to trading, but the company must meet the applicable requirements, which include the number of owners (range), number of shares, market value and history. To be listed the exchange includes strict requirements on the treatment of confidential information.
Companies that meet the requirements for listing can much easier get access to capital through share issues. Many investors only invest in securities listed on a stock exchange, because those papers are easier to sell.

Indices
OBX – The index comprises the 25 most traded shares listed on Oslo Børs. The OBX index is tradable, meaning that you can buy and sell listed futures and options on the index. Put another way, you can get the same exposure by purchasing an index product as if you buy all the shares (weighted) included in the index. The rating is based on a six-month trading period. The index is adjusted every third Friday in June and December.
OSEBX – The Oslo Børs Benchmark Index (Norwegian: Hovedindeks) is an investable index containing a representative selection of all listed shares on Oslo Børs. The OSEBX is revised on a half year basis and the changes are implemented on December 1 and June 1. OSEFX – The Oslo Børs Mutual Fund Index (Norwegian: Fondsindeks) has the same constituents as OSEBX but applies a weight capping to comply with UCITS.

Building

The over 190-year-old stock exchange building has been the subject of many long debates about how the building should be managed and designed over the years. Several of Christiania's (the name of Oslo between 1624 and 1925) best known business men fought for years to get approved and funded the construction of a stock exchange in Christiania, the capital of Norway from 1814.

In 1823, a building committee was appointed to consider the various suggested drawings at the time. The committee chose the architect Christian H. Grosch's proposal. On July 14, 1826, the Ministry approved the final plans of drawings and budgets. In 1828, it was called Norway's first monumental building, completed on the site called Grønningen, the first public park in Christiania.

See also
List of companies listed on the Oslo Stock Exchange
List of companies delisted from Oslo Stock Exchange
List of stock exchanges
Oslo Børs Holding

References

External links

 
Financial services companies of Norway
Buildings and structures in Oslo
Economy of Oslo
Stock exchanges in Norway
Companies based in Oslo
Financial services companies established in 1819
1819 establishments in Norway
Oslo
2019 mergers and acquisitions